Kinver Edge is a high heath and woodland escarpment just west of Kinver, about four miles west of Stourbridge, and four miles north of Kidderminster, and is on the border between Worcestershire and Staffordshire, England. It is now owned by the National Trust.

History
Kinver Edge is a remnant of the Mercian forest, although much planting dates from post-1945. There are two Iron Age hillforts on Kinver Edge; the larger one, Kinver Edge Hillfort, is at the northern end, while the other is at the southern end, on a promontory known as Drakelow Hill.

The area has been a popular local tourist destination since Edwardian times, when an electric tramway, the Kinver Light Railway, connected Kinver to the Birmingham tram system.

The National Trust was given 198 acres of Kinver Edge in 1917 by the children of Thomas Grosvenor Lee, a Birmingham solicitor born in Kinver, in memory of Lee and his wife. The Trust acquired a further 85 acres between 1964 and 1980. In 2014 Worcestershire Council Cabinet approved the transfer of Kingsford Forest Park (also known as Kingsford Country Park) to the National Trust. The transfer had been completed by 2018, with 'Kingsford Forest Park' signs being replaced by 'National Trust Kinver Edge' signs. The total area covered by Kinver Edge now amounts to approximately 600 acres.

Rock Houses
Kinver Edge is home to the last troglodyte dwellings occupied in England, with a set of complete cave-houses excavated into the local sandstone. One of the rocks, "Holy Austin", was a hermitage until the Reformation. The Holy Austin rock houses were inhabited until the 1960s. They are now owned by the National Trust and are open for tour.  One house has been restored to a Victorian appearance, and the Martindale Caves show what life was like in the 1930s. The cottage gardens and an orchard are being replanted and restored.

Other cave dwellings found on Kinver Edge include:
Nanny's Rock, a large cavern with five compartments which was apparently never converted into a house.  For many years it was known as 'Meg-o-Fox-Hole'; the parish register records the death on 8 June 1617 of one 'Margaret of the fox earth' who may have lived there. 
Vale's Rock, also known as Crow's Rock, later turned into a house on two levels. It was also inhabited until the 1960s but due to its dangerous condition has since been fenced off to prevent public access.

Geography
Kinver Edge is situated to the east of the Severn Valley, and is in the South Staffordshire/Wyre Forest Districts. It is situated in green belt land, and is at the very edge of the urban metropolitan West Midlands. Kinver Edge rises to 164 metres (538 ft) above sea level at the summit, and provides views to the Clent Hills, Shatterford Hill, Dudley, Wenlock Edge, Malvern Hills and the Shropshire Hills.

The Edge is a sandstone ridge topped with Bunter pebbles, and is subject to erosion.

Flora and fauna
Kinver Edge contains two areas of heathland, the larger near the top of the escarpment in the north and the smaller in the former Forest Park to the south.  The broadleaf woodland in the north includes birch, oak and sweet chestnut trees, while the former Forest Park is largely made up of coniferous plantation woodlands.  the National Trust is proposing to restore a further 47.9 acres of heathland in the former Forest Park over the next 10 years.

The heathland on Kinver Edge is inhabited by wildlife, including the adder, common lizard, and heathland birds such as the skylark. Common buzzard, Eurasian jay, great spotted woodpecker, and many other bird species are present in the woods, as are the badger and red fox.

From time to time longhorn cattle are allowed to graze on the heathland areas.

Contemporary uses
The primary economic activity is tourism and estate management. The Staffordshire Way long-distance footpath passes over the summit, while the North Worcestershire Path runs through the former Forest Park, which is also used for mountain biking.

References

Notes

External links
 Kinver Edge and the Rock Houses - National Trust
 Internet Guide to Stourbridge Kinver Page
 BBC Radio 4 documentary about Kinver Edge (listen online)

Hills of Staffordshire
Hills of Worcestershire
National Trust properties in Staffordshire
Sites of Special Scientific Interest in Staffordshire
Sites of Special Scientific Interest in Worcestershire
South Staffordshire District
Historic house museums in Staffordshire
Escarpments of England